Henry Wright was Archdeacon of Kilmacduagh" p105:  from 1745 until his death in 1750.

Wright was born in Dublin and educated at Trinity College, Dublin.  He was a Prebendary of Clonfert from 1721 until his death.

References

Archdeacons of Kilmacduagh
Alumni of Trinity College Dublin
18th-century Irish Anglican priests
1750 deaths
Christian clergy from Dublin (city)